The 1989 Limerick Senior Hurling Championship was the 95th staging of the Limerick Senior Hurling Championship since its establishment by the Limerick County Board in 1887.

Patrickswell were the defending champions.

On 10 September 1989, Ballybrown won the championship after a 4-10 to 2-09 defeat of Doon in the final. It was their first ever championship title.

Results

Final

Championship statistics

Miscellaneous
 Ballybrown win their first senior title.

References

Limerick Senior Hurling Championship
Limerick Senior Hurling Championship